The Texas Interurban Railway was an electric interurban railroad that operated from Dallas, Texas, to Terrell and Denton from 1923 to 1932.  The Missouri–Kansas–Texas Railroad (Katy) line was electrified between Dallas and Denton and services were withdrawn after the Dallas Union Trust Company foreclosed.


Services
As part of the contract that created Dallas Power and Light, which first provided electric power in Dallas, the parent company, General Electric, was required to build two  interurban systems from Dallas, guaranteed by a bond of $550,000. The  line from Dallas to Terrell opened on January 14, 1923.

An interurban service from Dallas to Denton had been proposed in 1906, but it was 1923 before the company Strickland, Calder and Hobson, who were to become the Texas Interurban Railway Company, began work on the Missouri–Kansas–Texas Railroad (Katy) branch between Dallas and Denton. After a legal battle with landowners in Dallas, the inaugural trip was made on September 30, 1924. A public service started the next day, costing $1.25 for a one-way ticket and $2.40 for a return ($ and $ in  adjusted for inflation). The  line had 25 stops, with city termini on branches off the Katy line; in Denton the brick terminal was built at the corner of Ash (Austin) and McKinney streets. The line was electrified using a catenary with power supplied from three substations. Six passenger cars and one express car provided an hourly service from Denton from 5 am and 6 pm.

The bus service between Dallas and Denton began offering lower fares from 1925, and though the line to Terrell was profitable, the Denton line was never financially successful. The rail service was withdrawn on March 13, 1932, after the Dallas Union Trust Company foreclosed on the Texas Interurban Railway. The property was auctioned off, the cars transferred to the Dallas Railway and Terminal Company and some were later used as trolleys in Dallas until 1956.

References

Notes

Sources

Defunct Texas railroads
Interurban railways in Texas
Railway lines opened in 1924
Railway lines closed in 1932